Welcome is the debut studio album by Swiss recording artist Patrick Nuo. It was released by Warner Music on September 4, 2003 in German-speaking Europe and reached the top twenty of the German and Swiss Albums Charts.

Track listing

Charts

References

2003 albums
Pop rock albums by Swiss artists